Jan Weber (also known as Honza Weber, born 28 August 1986) is multiple World and European Freestyle footbag champion. He has been playing footbag since 2001 and since 2002 competed at more than 200 professional footbag events and performed at more than 2000 public events. He had gained his master's degree at the University of Economics, Prague and later became a professional freestyler. The biggest successes Weber achieved are 4 World Champion titles in doubles Freestyle footbag and 5 World Champion titles in singles discipline, 3 in a row in years 2011, 2012 and 2013. After that Weber stopped competing and was primarily focusing on live shows and footbag promotion. However, in 2020 he returned after 7 years for an online World championships, where he gained his 8th World Champion title and remained unbeaten also in 2021 when he added his last WC online title.

Weber has also started to play Freestyle football in 2010. He was a member of the organising crew of the first annual European Freestyle football in 2010 and first annual World Freestyle football championships in 2011 and 2012, all in Prague. He finished 5th at both World Championships in one of the events called Sick3. He won the Sick3 event at 2012 Czech Freestyle football championship and won the Czech Cup in 2013 and 2015.

In 2010 he took part in Czech TV talent show called "Talentmania", where he managed to advance into the semifinals and perform a flawless routine there. A year later he entered another Czech Got Talent show with his Freestyle footbag doubles partner. They impressed the jury members and also managed to advance further in the competition. In 2012, he again entered the TV show with his freestyle team called "Freestyle Union". In September 2011 Weber won the first annual Czech and Slovak Skittling championships. Later in 2011 he also won The Prague University talent show with his Freestyle Union team (footbag, yo-yo, Freestyle frisbee and Freestyle football). The finals of the show took place in the Lucerna Palace in the centre of Prague with more than 5000 spectators. In 2010 Honza (a version of Weber's Czech name Jan and his international nickname) met one of his heroes Tony Hawk. Honza performed in Hollywood at Tony Hawk's charity event "Stand up for Skateparks". Most of Honza's charity activities are connected with the Czech UNICEF organisation.

Honza also holds more than 20 Czech and World freestyle records. His most famous World record is controlling the football into juggles after the ball was dropped from a helicopter from 60 meters height. It later became a TV commercial for EURO2020. In 2014 he became a face for the autumn TIKI-TAKA campaign of Cruyff Classics, the sports clothing brand named after the famous Dutch football player Johan Cruyff. In 2015 he was featured in the Nissan "Truckerball" commercial for The UEFA Champions League.

Top4Football TV 
Honza's football skills are visible through his online series call Top4Football TV, where he test the latest products with famous football players such as Petr Čech, Tomáš Rosický or Pavel Nedvěd, who also invited him for a guidance in Italian Juventus. There Honza also shot an episode with Bosnian star Miralem Pjanić.

Awards and titles

2021
World championships (online), shred-off - 1st place

2020
World championships (online), singles - 1st place

2016
World championships, request - 1st place
Czech championships, singles - 1st place

2015
Czech cup Freestyle football - 1st place

2014
Czech championships, singles - 1st place

2013
World championships, singles - 1st place
World championships, circle - 1st place
World championships, request - 1st place

2012
World championships, singles - 1st place
European championships, singles - 1st place

2011
World championships, singles - 1st place
World championships, shred 30 - 01st place

2010
Czech championships, singles - 1st place
European championships, singles - 1st place

2009
World championships, singles - 3rd place
Czech championships, singles - 1st place
Czech championships, shred 30 - 1st place

2008
European championships, singles - 3rd place
European championships, shred 30 - 1st place
European championships, doubles - 1st place
European championships, circle - 1st place
World championships, singles - 4th place
World championships, doubles - 1st place
Czech championships, singles - 1st place
Czech championships, shred 30 - 1st place

2007
European championships, singles - 2nd place
European championships, shred 30 - 2nd place
World championships, doubles - 1st place
World championships, shred 30 - 4th place
Czech championships, singles - 1st place
Czech championships, shred 30 - 1st place

2006
World championships, singles - 2nd place
World championships, shred 30 - 2nd place
Czech championships, singles - 2nd place
Czech championships, shred 30 - 2nd place
Czech championships, doubles - 1st place

2005
European championships, singles - 2nd place
European championships, shred 30 - 2nd place
European championships, doubles - 1st place
World championships, singles - 2nd place
World championships, shred 30 - 2nd place
World championships, doubles - 1st place
Czech championships, singles - 2nd place
Czech championships, shred 30 - 2nd place
Czech championships, doubles - 1st place

2004
European championships, singles - 2nd place
European championships, shred 30 - 1st place
European championships, doubles - 1st place
World championships, singles - 2nd place
World championships, shred 30 - 2nd place
World championships, doubles - 1st place
Czech championships, singles - 2nd place
Czech championships, shred 30 - 2nd place
Czech championships, doubles - 1st place

2003
European championships, singles - 2nd place
European championships, shred 30 - 2nd place
World championships, singles - 4th place
Czech championships, shred 30 - 2nd place
Czech championships, doubles - 1st place

2002
European championships, singles - 2nd place
Czech championships, singles - 2nd place
Czech championships, shred 30 - 2nd place
Czech championships, doubles - 3rd place

External links 

 HonzaWeber.com - Official website of the World Footbag Champion Jan Weber
 International Footbag Players Association IFPA

1986 births
Living people
Czech footbag players